Beulah is a small village, wider community and electoral ward located halfway between the market town of Newcastle Emlyn and the seaside resort of Aberporth in Ceredigion, Wales.

The wider community area of Beulah also covers the villages of Llandygwydd, Betws Ifan, Brongwyn, Tŷ-llwyd, Cwm-cou and the larger part of Cenarth, which it shares with Carmarthenshire across the River Teifi.

Governance
The Beulah electoral ward's population was 1,617 in 2001, increasing slightly to 1,627 at the 2011 Census. The ward is coterminous with the community and elects one county councillor to Ceredigion County Council. Prior to 1995 it was a ward for Dyfed County Council and included the neighbouring communities of Troedyraur and Llangoedmor.

Attractions 
The area's attractions include Cenarth Falls waterfalls on the Teifi and Felin Geri watermill in Ceri Valley.

References

External links
www.geograph.co.uk : photos of Beulah and surrounding area

Villages in Ceredigion
Communities in Ceredigion
Wards of Ceredigion
Wards of Dyfed